The posterior vein of the left ventricle runs on the diaphragmatic surface of the left ventricle to the coronary sinus, but may end in the great cardiac vein.

References

Veins of the torso